Abdoulaye Ouattara (born 8 January 2001) is a French professional footballer who plays as a defensive midfielder for Greek Super League 2 club Episkopi.

Career
Ouattara made his professional Fortuna Liga debut for FK Senica against ŠK Slovan Bratislava on 12 February 2022.

References

External links
 FK Senica official club profile 
 
 Futbalnet profile 
 

2001 births
Living people
People from Montreuil, Seine-Saint-Denis
French footballers
Association football midfielders
Olympique Lyonnais players
FK Senica players
Slovak Super Liga players
Expatriate footballers in Slovakia